The Budapest University of Technology and Economics ( or in short ), official abbreviation BME, is the most significant university of technology in Hungary and is considered the world's oldest institute of technology which has university rank and structure. It was the first institute in Europe to train engineers at university level. It was founded in 1782.

More than 110 departments and institutes operate within the structure of eight faculties. About 1100 lecturers, 400 researchers and other degree holders and numerous invited lecturers and practising expert specialists participate in education and research at the Budapest University of Technology and Economics. Approximately 1381 of the university's 21,171 students are foreigners, coming from 50 countries. The Budapest University of Technology and Economics issues about 70% of Hungary's engineering degrees. 34 professors/researchers of the university are members of the Hungarian Academy of Sciences.

Training courses are provided in five languages: Hungarian, English, German, French and Russian.

The ECTS credit system was introduced in 1995. This helps students to enroll in the student exchange program of the European Union, the Socrates (also known as Erasmus), and earn a double degree through the Top Industrial Managers for Europe network.

History

1635 – Archbishop Péter Pázmány, primate of Hungary, founds the University of Nagyszombat (today Trnava, Slovakia)
Late 18th century – The university moves to Buda and becomes the University of Buda.
1735 – The "Berg-Schola," the world's first institute of technology, was founded in Selmecbánya, Kingdom of Hungary (today Banská Štiavnica, Slovakia) in 1735. Many members of the first teaching staff of BME arrived from Selmecbánya.
1782 – Emperor Joseph II establishes the Institutum Geometricum as part of the Faculty of Liberal Arts at the University of Buda. The Institutum, the direct predecessor of the Budapest University of Technology and Economics, is the first in Europe to award engineering degrees to students of land surveying, river control, and road construction.
1850 – The Institutum Geometricum merges with the Joseph College of Technology.
1856 – The merged institutions become the Royal Joseph Polytechnic.
1860 – Hungarian replaces Latin as the language of instruction.
1862 – Royal Joseph Polytechnic becomes the Royal Joseph University.
1872 – Royal Joseph University gains full autonomy and the right to issue engineering diplomas after five years of studies. It is among the first institutions in Europe, to train engineers on university level.
1901 – Royal Joseph University is entitled to confer the doctoral degree, "Doctor Rerum Technicarum."
1910 – The university moved to its current site near Gellért square (next to the Art Nouveau Hotel Gellért).
1925 – First women students enroll.
1934 – The university was reorganized again as Palatine Joseph University of Technology and Economics and it played a dominant role in the interwar industrialization process, together with engineering and economist training in Hungary.
1939 – The Institute for Continuing Education opens its gates.
1949 – The name "Technical University of Budapest" becomes official. At this time the university consists of the faculties of: Civil Engineering, Mechanical Engineering, Architecture, Chemical Engineering and Electrical Engineering (in historical order).
1955 – Faculty of Transportation Engineering is established.
1956 – The 1956 Hungarian Revolution was partly launched by students at the university, followed by many professors.
1967 – The two technical universities seated in Budapest were merged to form the Technical University of Budapest, with six faculties.
1984 – Instruction is offered in English as well as Hungarian.
1994 – The Technical University of Budapest is among the first universities in Hungary to introduce the credit system. The university applies the credit assignment according to the European Credit Transfer System (ECTS) in its accredited academic programs.
1998 – Faculty of Natural Sciences and Faculty of Economic and Social Sciences are established.
2000 – The official name changes to Budapest University of Technology and Economics.

Faculties

At present the university has eight Faculties (founding date in parentheses):

Faculty of Civil Engineering (1782)
Civil engineering

Faculty of Mechanical Engineering (1871)
Mechanical engineering
Mechatronics engineering
Energy engineering
Industrial design engineering
Industrial Command Engineering

Faculty of Architecture (1873)
Architecture

Faculty of Chemical Technology and Biotechnology (1873)
Chemical engineering
Biochemical engineering
Environmental engineering

Faculty of Electrical Engineering and Informatics (1949)
Electrical Engineering
Computer Science Engineering

Faculty of Transportation Engineering and Vehicle Engineering (1955)
Transportation engineering
Vehicle engineering
Logistics engineering

Faculty of Natural Sciences (1998*)
Mathematics
Physics
Computational and Cognitive Neuroscience

Faculty of Economic and Social Sciences (1998*)
Technical
Engineering management
Technical education
Economic
Applied economics
Business and management
International business
Regional and environmental economics
Social
Communication and media studies
The Faculty of Natural and Social Sciences was founded in 1987 and separated in 1998.

The organizational structure

The Budapest University of Technology and Economics (BME) is a public higher education institute operating as a central budgetary institution. Its founding regulation has been issued by the Minister of Human Resources. Its Organizational and operational conditions are summarized in its own regulation in accordance with laws.

The steering body of the university is the Senate. BME is divided into faculties.

The faculties in the order of their founding:

Faculty of Civil Engineering (ÉMK)
Faculty of Mechanical Engineering (GPK)
Faculty of Architecture (ÉPK)
Faculty of Chemical Technology and Biotechnology (VBK)
Faculty of Electrical Engineering and Informatics (VIK)
Faculty of Transportation Engineering and Vehicle Engineering (KJK)
Faculty of Natural Sciences (TTK)
Faculty of Economic and Social Sciences (GTK)

Education, research, innovation and direct additional services are proceeded by the faculties. Work-sharing between the faculties are subject oriented both in the fields of education and that of technology. The organogram of BME is available here. The faculties consist of departments, institutes, research centres that are supported by deans offices and other units.
Governing is assisted by the Rectors Office and the Chancellors Office. There is a highly independent Group of integrated internal control.

Faculties and Students organizations are supported by service units.

The core and ancillary activities are supported

with system management and system support services
by the units of Chancellery
with specialized services, like
library and information management
by the National Technical Information Centre and Library and within it the University Archives
student registration, study management and coordination
by the Central Student Office
student support and advice management together with cultural services
by the Student Service Directorate
secretariat of Senate, Rectors Council and Ethics Committee
by the Rectors Office
assistance to the faculty councils, education committees and other committees of the faculties
by deans offices
secretariat of the University Committee of Teaching Authorization and Doctoral Council and Scientific Students Association
by the Central Student Office
assistance to the BME Organization of Union of Higher Education Employee, and the BME Unite of the Union of Employee in Public Culture and Collections, the Council of Public Employee and the BME Committee of Equal Opportunities
by the Office of Representations
assistance to the governing body of University Student and Doctoral Student Representation (EHDK)
by the Student Service Directorate
with coordination of independent organizational units and activities
by other umbrella organizations

There are other organizations like companies established or owned by the university, welfare institutions, student or teacher activity groups and other organizations associated to the university.

The Rector is the top manager and representative of the university. The Chancellor ensures the technical conditions, the administration, the financial management in order to complete the functions of the university. The Rector and the Chancellor regularly calls executive board meetings to prepare strategic decisions. Employment relations between are regulated in the Annex of the Human Resource Policy.

Admissions
All Hungarians who pass the Hungarian secondary school matura with enough points are eligible for admission, as well as for anyone else in possession of an International Baccalaureate (again, with enough points).

As with all Hungarian universities, a tuition fee of around $1000 has to be paid each semester for the Hungarian program. No extra fee is required for Hungarians for whom it is their first university, unless they spend more than 13 semesters there.

The university offers extensive English language programs on all its faculties, at all levels of study (Preparatory Year, Bachelor of Science, Bachelor of Arts, Master of Science, Doctor of Philosophy). The Tuition fees vary from €2000 - €4500 per semester.
6% of all students come from different countries of the world representing over fifty different countries; the majority of the students in the English Program are from the United States, England and Germany.

Location

The university is located on the Buda side of the Danube between Szabadság Bridge and Petőfi Bridge and towards Rákóczi Bridge. This makes the university campus especially long and narrow: walking from one side of the university to the other can take as much as 20 minutes.

The Inner City of Budapest (Pest) is just across the river, about 10 minutes' walk by either of the bridges.

Famous alumni

Nobel laureates
 Dénes Gábor (Dennis Gábor), inventor of holography (1971 Nobel Prize in Physics)
 George Oláh, (1994 Nobel Prize in Chemistry)
 Jenő Wigner (Eugene Wigner), (1963 Nobel Prize in Physics)

Others
András Arató (Electrical engineer and model, known for the internet meme Hide the Pain Harold)
Donát Bánki (Co-inventor of the modern carburetor)
 Pál Erdős (Mathematician)
 Károly Ereky (Agricultural engineer, born Károly Wittmann, known as Karl Ereky, coined the notion: biotechnology in 1919)
 Alfréd Hajós (Olympic champion swimmer)
 Zoltan Hajos (Organic Chemist)
 Alajos Hauszmann (Architect of the Buda Castle)
 Csaba Horváth (Chemical Engineer, built the first high performance liquid chromatograph)
 Imre Kacskovics (Immunologist and the Dean of the ELTE Faculty of Science)
 Kálmán Kandó ("Father" of the AC powered electric locomotive, Rotary phase converter)
 Tódor Kármán (Theodore von Kármán, "Father" of super-sonic flight)
 Károly Kós (Architect of the Budapest Zoo and Botanical Garden)
 Imre Makovecz (Architect, one of the most prominent proponents of organic architecture)
 Dénes Mihály (Engineer, inventor)
 Samu Pecz (Architect of the Great Market Hall (Budapest))
 Josef Petzval (Physicist, mathematician and inventor)
 Ernő Rubik (Architect, inventor of mechanical puzzles)
 Frigyes Schulek (Architect of the Fisherman's Bastion)
 Károly Simonyi (Physicist, father of Charles Simonyi)
 Max Speter (chemist and science historian)
 Imre Steindl (Architect of the Hungarian Parliament)
 Leó Szilárd (Physicist, "father" of the atomic bomb, one of two co-inventors of nuclear reactor)
 Kálmán Tihanyi (First patent on fully electronical TV, Inventor of Plasma TV, CRT-tube pioneer, designed the first pilotless aircraft)
 Eva Vecsei (Architect, based in Montreal)

Sports
The university has one sports club, the Műegyetemi AFC, which played in the first 1901 Hungarian League season. The university hosted the IFIUS 2008 World Interuniversity Games in October.

National Technical Information Centre and Library
The National Technical Information Centre and Library at the Budapest University of Technology and Economics (BME OMIKK) is the successor of two major libraries in Hungary.

The Central Library of BME

The library of the Budapest University of Technology and Economics (then Joseph Polytechnics) was formally founded in 1848 when Baron József Eötvös, Minister of Religion and Public Education donated a book in five volumes that become the first item in the inventory of the library.

Since its foundation it moved with the university from Pest to the Buda Castle in 1854 and back to Pest in 1872. In 1882 it moved again, to the campus near the National Museum, now the campus of Faculty of Humanities of Eötvös Loránd University. In 1909 the Library was moved to a separated cathedral like building in the new Campus of BME. The building was designed by Samu Pécz, professor of architecture at the university. The eastern facade is connected to the central building of the university with the 'Bridge of Sighs'. The architectural concept has been proven timeless.

Later on the storage capacity was enlarged with the introduction of compact storage technology, and adding a large capacity underground storage facility under the garden of the Campus.

Today a remote storage building near Budapest is also used.

In the beginning the library was directed by university professors. The first full-time director was appointed in 1936.

In the early years the library served only professors. It was opened for students in 1869, and for the general public in 1884.

In 1884 the first classification system of the library was elaborated and the first printed catalogue of the library was published by Vince Wartha, who was by the way professor of urban chemical technologies, dealing with construction materials, with gas production and water supply, and rector of university two times. In the following years extended editions of the printed catalogue were published and distributed to the departments and to other major libraries in the country. In 1936 the library introduced the index card system of catalogue.
Transition to electronic cataloguing began in the 1980s, and the integrated library system was introduced in the 1990s. With the spreading of internet and widening the bandwidth the catalogue has become available from anywhere.

The library collection was extended by acquisitions, and with donations of professors. There were two major additions by receiving the heritage of baron József Eötvös in 1872, and of Károly Hieronymi engineer and politician in 1912.

During the Second World War both the building and the collection were damaged. Nevertheless, it continued its work in 1945, and the main reading room was reopened during the academic year of 1949–1950.

Since 1952, increasing amount of the collection has been placed on open shelves for direct access of the readers. In the beginning only fiction, later on handbooks, and nowadays textbooks and current literature can be found on the shelves in the reading rooms.
In 1953 the library started publishing serials (Methodical papers of the Central Library of Budapest Technical University, publications on history of science and engineering, Scientific Technical Bibliographies) and some other serials in the 1960s.

Since the mid sixties the library takes part in the instruction of first year students with training on using the library and in teaching literature search skills.

In 1991 the library opened the Study of Natural Sciences with mostly chemistry-regarded literature open shelves.

The library is the centre of the library network of the university, and the thematic library in mathematics and physics.

The National Technical Information Centre and Library (OMIKK)
In 1883 Ágoston Trefort, minister of education opened the Technological Museum including a library consisting the “basic Hungarian and international literature dealing with industry”.
In 1889 the library was moved and merged with the library of Public Polytechnics. In 1921 the Institute of Technological and Material Testing was established, merging two institutions. With the integration, the Library of Technological Institute was formed. From 1923 the library was intensively developed by the direction of Géza Káplány. In 1949 the Library of Technology was formally merged with the Technical Documentation Centre. Since then the library started establishing liaison libraries in the country. In 1952 the name changed to National Technical Library. In 1956 the Library was moved into a representative building near the National Museum.
In 1982 with the introduction of electronic technologies and with the development of information exchange of cooperating libraries on multinational level the library took the name of National Technical Information Centre and Library. After several changes in the organization and supervision, in 2001, with the decision of the minister of education, most of the tasks, the staff and the whole collection of the National Technical Information Centre and Library were integrated into the Library of Budapest University of Technology and Economics.

BME OMIKK, the integrated library
After the integration of the two libraries the Main Reading Room were renovated and under it the Reading Room of Technical and Natural Sciences was created, three reading rooms in the central university building were formed, and a service tunnel connecting the library building with the underground storage facility and with the new reading rooms was constructed.
In 2011, following the erection of new university buildings in the new southern (Lágymányos) campus, a new service point of BME OMIKK was opened in building “I”.

University rank

The Budapest University of Technology and Economics ranked 250th in mechanical engineering by QS 2017 world ranking.

It takes the 322nd place among the world's top 400 universities for engineering and technology, being the only university from Hungary that is listed in Quacquarelli Symonds ranking.

Times Higher Education, THE ranked it as 1001+ world university ranking, 2020 behind prominent universities in Africa, including the university of lagos, Unilag.

See also
 Műegyetemi AFC
 Matrix (blinkenlights)

Notes and references

External links

 

 
1782 establishments in the Habsburg monarchy
Educational institutions established in 1782
Engineering universities and colleges in Hungary
Technical universities and colleges
Public universities